The San Diego Padres farm system consists of six Minor League Baseball affiliates across the United States and in the Dominican Republic. Four affiliates are independently owned, while one complex-based rookie level team in the Arizona Complex League and one in the Dominican Summer League are own by the Padres.

The Padres have been affiliated with the High-A Fort Wayne TinCaps of the Midwest League since 1999, making it the longest-running active affiliation in the organization among teams not owned by the Padres. This is also the longest affiliation in team history. Their newest affiliate is the San Antonio Missions of the Texas League, which became the Padres' Double-A club in 2021.

2021–present
The current structure of Minor League Baseball is the result of an overall contraction of the system beginning with the 2021 season. Class A was reduced to two levels: High-A and Low-A. Low-A was reclassified as Single-A in 2022.

1990–2020
Minor League Baseball operated with six classes from 1990 to 2020. The Class A level was subdivided for a second time with the creation of Class A-Advanced. The Rookie level consisted of domestic and foreign circuits.

1969–1989
The foundation of the minors' current structure was the result of a reorganization initiated by Major League Baseball (MLB) before the 1963 season. The reduction from six classes to four (Triple-A, Double-AA, Class A, and Rookie) was a response to the general decline of the minors throughout the 1950s and early-1960s when leagues and teams folded due to shrinking attendance caused by baseball fans' preference for staying at home to watch MLB games on television. The only change made within the next 27 years was Class A being subdivided for the first time to form Class A Short Season in 1966.

References

External links 
 Major League Baseball Prospect News: San Diego Padres
 Baseball-Reference: San Diego Padres League Affiliations

Minor league affiliates